The 2016–17 Slovenian PrvaLiga (also known as the Prva liga Telekom Slovenije for sponsorship reasons) was the 26th edition of the Slovenian PrvaLiga since its establishment in 1991. The season began on 16 July 2016 and ended on 27 May 2017. The official fixture schedule was released on 24 June 2016.

Competition format
Each team played 36 matches (18 home and 18 away). Teams played four matches against each other (2 home and 2 away).

Teams

Promotion and relegation (pre-season)
A total of ten teams contested the league, including eight from the 2015–16 Slovenian PrvaLiga and two promoted from the 2015–16 Slovenian Second League. Radomlje won direct promotion as winners of the 2015–16 Slovenian Second League. They replaced Krka in the top division, who placed at the bottom of the 2015–16 Slovenian PrvaLiga table. This was the second season for Radomlje in top flight, having previously been a member during the 2014–15 Slovenian PrvaLiga season.

The PrvaLiga play-off for the final spot in the top division was played between Zavrč and Aluminij. Zavrč won the play-off fixture with the score 4–3 on aggregate, but the club was unsuccessful in obtaining a licence to play in the top division for the next season, due to financial reasons. The Football Association of Slovenia then invited Aluminij to take their spot and the side from Kidričevo accepted. Aluminij had previously played in the PrvaLiga during the 2012–13 season.

Stadiums and locations

1Seating capacity only. Some stadiums also have standing areas.
2Radomlje played its home games in Domžale, because their home venue did not meet PrvaLiga stadium criteria.

Personnel and kits

Managerial changes

Transfers

League table

Standings

Positions by round

Source: PrvaLiga official website

Results

First half of the season

Second half of the season

PrvaLiga play-off
The two-legged play-off between Aluminij, the ninth-placed team in PrvaLiga and Ankaran Hrvatini, the third-placed team in the 2. SNL, should have been played in June 2017. However, on 1 June 2017, the Football Association of Slovenia announced that FC Koper did not obtain a competition licence for PrvaLiga. Therefore, the play-offs were not held and both Aluminij and Ankaran Hrvatini secured a place in the 2017–18 PrvaLiga season.

Season statistics

Top goalscorers

Source: PrvaLiga official website

Top assists

Source: PrvaLiga official website

Own goals

Hat-tricks

Discipline and Fairplay

Attendances

 
Note1: Team played the previous season in the Slovenian Second League.

Awards

Annual awards
PrvaLiga Player of the season
Dare Vršič
PrvaLiga Goalkeeper of the season
Jasmin Handanović

PrvaLiga U23 Player of the season
Luka Zahović

PrvaLiga Team of the season

See also
2016–17 Slovenian Football Cup
2017 Slovenian Football Cup Final
2016–17 Slovenian Second League

References

External links
 
2016–17 PrvaLiga at Soccerway.com

Slovenian PrvaLiga seasons
Slovenia
1